24 Hours is a 2000 Russian crime film directed by Aleksandr Atanesyan.

Plot 
The film tells about the killer Felix, who carries out an expensive order, despite the warning. The one whom the customer called the oilman was quietly killed, which makes the performer think that he will not be forgiven for the murder. Felix now has only 24 hours to get to the island, where his beloved woman and money are waiting for him.

Cast 
 Maksim Sukhanov as Felix
 Andrey Panin as Lyova Shalamov
 Sergei Novikov as Garik Shalamov
 Mikhail Kozakov as Kosta
 Tatyana Samoylova as mother
 Igor Starygin as Lawyer
 Georgiy Taratorkin as General
 Natalya Rogozhkina as Lyusya
 Vladimir Eryomin as Vernik
 Dmitriy Mukhamadeev as Sergeant

References

External links 
 

2000 films
2000s Russian-language films
Russian action drama films
2000 action drama films
2000 crime drama films
2000s crime action films
Russian crime drama films
Russian crime action films